The Rebis (from the Latin res bina, meaning dual or double matter) is the end product of the alchemical magnum opus or great work. 

After one has gone through the stages of putrefaction and purification, separating opposing qualities, those qualities are united once more in what is sometimes described as the divine hermaphrodite, a reconciliation of spirit and matter, a being of both male and female qualities as indicated by the male and female head within a single body. The sun and moon correspond to the male and female halves, just as the Red King and White Queen are similarly associated. 

The Rebis image appeared in the work Azoth of the Philosophers by Basil Valentine in 1613.

In popular culture
 The Rebis is a central element in the fourth season of the television series Castlevania.
 A perfect being of both masculine (sun) and feminine (moon) qualities, brought about by an eclipse, is used in the manga and 2009 anime of Fullmetal Alchemist.
 The angelic antagonist of the first season of the 2008 anime Black Butler is a rebis, whose two forms initially appear as separate characters.
 In the Italian series Gomorrah, Genny Savastano wears a t-shirt with a rebis illustration in the second and third season.
 In the video game Elden Ring, the Rebis is a recurring cosmological theme. The game heavily references the alchemical magnum opus, especially as depicted in Ripley's scroll.
 In The Witcher action video game trilogy, Rebis is an alchemical ingredient.
 One of the versions of DC Comics' Negative Man, a member of the Doom Patrol, was a fusion of a male and a female called Rebis.
 In the Moebius/Jodorowski graphic novel series The Incal, a major character is a "perfect androgynous" called Solune (Sunmoon in the English translation)
 The rebis is featured in the cover artwork for Mastodon's second EP, Lifesblood.

See also
 Hieros gamos
 Nondualism
 Unity of opposites

Sources
 Robert Allen Bartlett, Real Alchemy: A Primer of Practical Alchemy, Hays (Nicolas) Ltd, 2009, 
 Barbara DiBernard, Alchemy and Finnegans Wake, Suny Press, 1980, p. 71,  
 Kathleen P. Long, Hermaphrodites in Renaissance Europe, Ashgate, 2006, p. 131, 
 Alexander Roob, Alchimie et mystique: le musée hermétique, Taschen GmbH, 2006, p. 494, 
 Murray Stein, Transformation: Emergence of the Self, Princeton University Press, 1989, p. 101
 Heinrich Nollius, Theoria philosophiae hermetica, Hanau, 1617
 Heinrich Jamsthaler, Viatorum spagyricum, Frankfurt a. M, Germany, 1625
 Lazarus Zetzner, Theatrum Chemicum, Strasbourg, 1661

External links
 Basil Valentine 'Azoth' images
 The Rebis image in Alchemy

Alchemical substances
Personifications
Transgender topics and religion
Androgyny